Santaldih College, established in 2008, is a new general degree college in Purulia district. It offers undergraduate courses in arts. It is affiliated to Sidho Kanho Birsha University.

Departments
ba programme history, pol science

Arts
Bengali
English
History

Political Science

See also

References

External links
Santaldih College
Sidho Kanho Birsha University
University Grants Commission
National Assessment and Accreditation Council

Colleges affiliated to Sidho Kanho Birsha University
Academic institutions formerly affiliated with the University of Burdwan
Universities and colleges in Purulia district
2008 establishments in West Bengal
Educational institutions established in 2008